Some of My Best Rappers Are Friends is the second mixtape by American R&B and soul recording artist The World Famous Tony Williams, released for free on January 13, 2012. It was presented by The Source Magazine, YouHeardThatNew.com & CloudKicker Clothing. Some of My Best Rappers Are Friends features guest appearances from Kanye West, Macklemore, Wale, Big K.R.I.T., Outlawz, Emilio Rojas, Freddie Gibbs, King Chip, GLC, STS, Mama Sol, Mickey Factz, Fonzworth Bentley, Kyle Lucas, CyHi The Prynce, Vonnegutt, Naledge, Gary the Storyteller, Fred Nukes and Kid Daytona.

Theme 
The World Famous Tony Williams crafted this project to advocate for genuine R&B music. Staying true to his "World Famous" moniker, Tony included collaborations with some of his world renowned contacts, who just so happen to make music, to add to his second studio project. The cover art includes animated graphics of some of his most prominent friends who he has made music with ranging from Big Sean and Rick Ross to legends like Kanye West and Jay Z.

Prologue 
Mr. Williams released a prologue in conjunction with the mixtape.

“INTEGRATION is the intermixing of people or groups previously separated.

I feel fortunate, as an artist, to have survived in the game long enough to experience a total changing of the guard or passing of the torch and still be standing and for that, I am, also, eternally grateful. Early in my career, I can recall when rappers would give a limb for an opportunity to spit eight bars on an R&B record (feel free to reference Tony, Toni, Tone’s 1990 smash, FEELS GOOD) and now, over twenty years later, the tables have turned, completely. These days, coming from R&B singers, it has become more of “Can a brother jump on a hook?” .

I’ve often expressed my dismay about how the success of hip hop, as well as, its survival has been at the expense of genuine R&B. I’ll admit, at times, that I have viewed it (hip hop) like a weed in a beautiful garden that eventually chokes out all the flowers until they no longer can breathe and eventually they die. The garden becomes so weed ravaged that in no time, at all, no one would believe what color, what beauty, what variations of species of plants, once lived and thrived there. However, this mixtape is my gesture in honor of the merits of hip hop as it relates to R&B music.

Every George Clinton and P-Funk sample ever created has, in a sense,”kept the funk alive”. Hip hop has been the catalyst for the careers of artist like Lauren hill, John Legend, Jill Scott, Anthony Hamilton, Janellle Monae, as well as sustained the careers of artist like Uncle Charlie Wilson.

In order for our garden to grow and thrive, we have to be willing to integrate our styles, our cultures and our knowledge musically. In the late 60’s and early 70’s integration was designed to give students of socio-economically disadvantaged groups the opportunity for a “better” education. Educators discovered that when students from every race, every economic background with a variety of exposure, of talent and skills came together and gleaned from one another these schools became breeding grounds for great successes. Some of the most novel ideas, greatest collaborations and partnerships came from this concept, the concept of “integration”.

I have chosen to follow my calling as advocate for the cause of genuine R&B music. Hip hop has swallowed up pure R&B and regurgitated a diluted hybrid. As a people, it is all of our duties to preserve treasures of the past, lest they vanish. In order to save the music, we must be willing to integrate our skills and be willing to work together. We must set aside our pride and realize that our past establishes our present and our present builds our future. By respecting our differences in age, cultures, experiences and abilities, we can come together and keep helping our music to evolve.

This mixtape is dedicated to Hip hop and every producer or rapper with whom I’ve had the good fortune to work, any rapper who I credit for helping me grow as an artist because of our proximity, any rapper with whom I have shared a mere conversation or any rapper whose body of work has served as my inspiration. I extend my gratitude to Kanye West, Jay Z, Pharelle, Will I Am, Common, No I.D. Q Tip, Talib Kwele, ?uestlove, The Roots, Whodini, Rick Ross, Diddy, Dr. Dre, Rhymefest, Malik Yusef, The RZA, Kid Cudi, Pete Rock, Consequence, Lupe Fiasco, Mos Def, DJ Toomp, ATrack, Young Jeezy, Ice Cube, MC Lyte, De La Soul, Snoop Dogg, and every producer that has ever used a sped up R&B/Soul sample as the backdrop of a song and most of all, any artist or producer who has allowed “a brotha to jump on a hook”.

Respectfully,

The World Famous Tony Williams”

Critical reception 
Upon its release, Some of My Best Rappers Are Friends has received favorable reviews from music critics. Rose Lilah of Hot New Hip Hop noted, "It's a worthy addition to a catalogue that has seen much growth since Tony Williams stepped foot in the rap game." Mizz E at You Heard That New addressed the project as "... a little present for your listening pleasure. Multiple publications raved about Another You which consequently featured the first written verse from Kanye West post Taylor Swift controversy. Bossip named Another You "One of the 10 Most Slept-On Songs of 2012. Complex named the feature by Kanye West on Another You one of the "20 Best Guest Verses of 2012 (So Far)." Singers Room included Another You in their list of the "40 Songs that Went Under the Radar in 2012".

Track listing 
From TheSource.

References 

2012 mixtape albums